Casa Balletbó  is a house located at Avinguda Verge de Canòlic, 78, Sant Julià de Lòria
Parish, Andorra. It is a heritage property registered in the Cultural Heritage of Andorra. It was built in 1950.

References

Sant Julià de Lòria
Houses in Andorra
Houses completed in 1950
Cultural Heritage of Andorra